The Battle of Baddowal was an attack in 1846 by troops of the Sikh Empire on a contingent of the British East India Company near Ludhiana in the present-day state of Punjab, India.

The Battle 
After the Sikh army was defeated in the Battle of Mudki and the Battle of Ferozeshah, the British army, led by Sir Harry Smith, marched to relieve Ludhiana. The rear of his Anglo-Indian column was attacked near Baddowal by Sikh troops under Ranjodh Singh. The British army lost baggage and stores. However a week later they defeated the Sikhs at the Battle of Aliwal

Ranjodh Singh Majithia, was the son of Desa Singh Mahithia, one of the most able ministers under Maharaja Ranjit Singh. Ranjodh Singh commanded a large army of ten thousand infantry and cavalry with sixty guns. They crossed the Sutlej and was joined by Ajit Singh of Ladwa. They marched towards Ludhiana and burnt a portion of the British cantonment. Harry Smith (afterwards Governor of Cape Colony), who was sent to relieve Ludhiana, marched eastwards from Ferozepur, keeping a few miles away from the Sutlej.

Ranjodh Singh Majithia attacked Smith’s column and when Smith tried to make a detour at Buddowal, attacked his rear with great vigour and captured his baggage train and stores on 21 January. Harry Smith states, "the enemy, with a dexterity and quickness not to be exceeded, formed a line of seven battalions directly across my rear, with guns in the intervals of battalions, for the purpose of attacking my column with his line. This was a very able and well-executed move, which rendered my position critical and demanded nerve and decision to evade the coming storm.”

As retribution, the British burnt the Buddowal Fort including the Indian civilians inside it. A memorial was built at this place to keep the legacy of this important event alive. 

http://www.anglosikhwars.com/battle-of-buddowal-21st-jan.../

References 

Anglo-Sikh wars